The Cardiff District and Penarth Harbour Tramways operated a tramway service in Cardiff between 1881 and 1903. Despite the title of the company, the services never reached Penarth.

History

The Cardiff District and Penarth Harbour Tramways Company built a line from Clifton Street in Roath to Clive Street in Grangetown. 

From 1881 to 1887, the line was operated by local businessman, Solomon Andrews. From 1888 it was operated by The Provincial Tramways Company

Closure

The line was taken over by Cardiff Corporation on 10 February 1903 for rebuilding and reconstruction. Services were continued by Cardiff Corporation Tramways.

References

Tram transport in Wales
1881 establishments in Wales